The Ministry of the Interior (MIR) is a department of the Government of Spain responsible for public security, the protection of the constitutional rights, the command of the law enforcement agencies, national security, immigration affairs, prisons, civil defense and road traffic safety. Through the Undersecretariat of the Interior and its superior body, the Directorate-General for Internal Policy, the Ministry is responsible for all actions related to ensuring political pluralism and the proper functioning of electoral processes.

The MIR is headed by the Minister for Home Affairs, who is appointed by the Monarch at request of the Prime Minister. The Minister is assisted by three main officials, the Secretary of State for Security, the Secretary-General for Penitentiary Institutions and the Under-Secretary of the Interior. Among the director generals, the most important are the Director-General of the Police and the Director-General of the Civil Guard.

This department has historically received numerous denominations such as Ministerio de la Gobernación (literally Ministry of the Governance), Ministerio de Orden Público (Ministry of Public Order) and Ministerio del Interior y Justicia (Ministry of the Interior and Justice) when both ministries joint in one.

As of 2020, Spain (central, regional and local governments) spends around € 24.6 billion per year on security and public order, which puts it at 2.1 % of GDP.

History

Early period 
The Ministry of the Interior responsibilities during centuries were assumed by the Royal Council of Castile (with the exception of the judicial ones). This body was composed for expert royal servants in charge of advising the Sovereign and with the passage of the time this royal servants gain more power and autonomy and they were the real governors of the Kingdom.

In the 18th century, the extinction of the Habsburg dynasty and the arrival of the Bourbons brought profound institutional reforms. With King Philip V, this Council extended its jurisdiction to the territories of the Crown of Aragon and the whole country was ruled by the same institutions. Also during this time, the Councils started to lose importance and the Secretariats of State and of the Dispatch were created.

Since 1621 existed in Spain the Secretariat of the Universal Dispatch, a unique government department where the sovereign delegated its power. With the new dynasty, it was necessary to divide it into several Secretariats of State that took care of the diverse administrative subjects: by means of the Decree of 11 July 1705, Philip V created a "Secretariat of State for War and Treasury" and another one for "Everything else".

But the accumulation of business and the need for a more agile body led to a system similar to that of France: the Decree of 30 November 1714, established four Secretariats of the Dispatch: of State, of War, of the Navy and of the Indies, and of Ecclesiastical business, justice and jurisdiction -, and questions of a financial nature were made to lie in the General Treasury. With slight variations, the result of various reforms, this situation will continue until the 1754-1755 biennium. With regard to the Secretariat of the Dispatch of Ecclesiastical Affairs, Justice and Jurisdiction, by Decree of 2 April 1717, it was renamed the Secretariat of the Dispatch of Justice, Political Government and Treasury of Spain and the Indies. It was commissioned to José Rodrigo. In the reform of 1720, it was named Secretariat of the Dispatch of Justice and Political Government of Spain and the Indies.

Late period 
However, the direct antecedent is at the beginning of the 19th century, first created by Bonaparte in 1808 in imitation of the French model and a few years later, in 1812, the Cortes of Cádiz created it the Secretariat of the Dispatch of the Governance of the Kingdom and Islands adjacent and the Secretary of the Dispatch of the Governance of the Kingdom for Overseas. The vast majority of authors do not consider the department created by the Napoleonic Government as the original one, because of its invasor nature.

With the return of Ferdinand VII, both secretaries were suppressed in 1814, restored during the Liberal Triennium and created as Ministry of the Interior in 1823, which lasted only a short time after being suppressed by King Ferdinand. In 1832 the Ministry of Development was created, which assumed security competences, fleeing from the denominations of "Interior" and "Governance" since they were reminiscent of the time of the war against Napoleon. In 1835 it was again called "Ministry of the Interior".

In 1847, all matters related to the services of public, economic and cultural works were disbanded from the Ministry of the Interior. The Ministry of the Interior maintained the functions of public order, municipal and provincial organization —being responsible for the Civil Governors—, health, post and telegraph, and the Overseas Office was incorporated. The so-called Sections were changed by Directorates-General, whose number was changing in the following decades.

During the reign of Alfonso XIII (1902-1931) the then created Institute of Social Reforms (1903), the Superior Charity Board (1908), the Internal Health Service (1909) were made dependent on the Ministry of the Interior; the Directorate-General for Security was divided into two sections, Surveillance and Security, and then called Public Order (1921); the Legal Department expanded its functions beyond the branch of charity (1913); the General Department of Charity (1919), the Health Department (1921), the Supply Department (1925) and the National Broadcasting Service (1929) were created.

Already during the Second Republic, by decree of the Presidency of the Council of Ministers of 16 August 1932, raised to the rank of Law on 8 September, the Directorate-General of the Civil Guard, which had been attached to the Ministry of War, and all the agencies and services of it dependents were transferred to the Ministry of the Interior, creating the Inspectorate-General of the Civil Guard. In 1933, the Health and Welfare services were transferred to the Ministry of Labor, Health and Welfare.

In 1959 the Central Traffic Office was created by Law 47/1959, of 30 July; the Technical General Secretariat by Decree 1841/1960, of 21 September, in accordance with the provisions of the Law on the Legal System of the State Administration of 26 July 1957; and the Data Processing Center by Order of 16 November 1971.

Democracy 
In 1977 it was renamed "Ministry of the Interior" and from then until now the Ministry has maintained this denomination, except for the period between 1994 and 1996, when it was renamed the Ministry of Justice and the Interior, structured in two main higher bodies, the Secretariat of State for Justice and the Secretariat of State for the Interior.

During the democratic period, the Ministry of the Interior has focused its powers on public security, losing its functions on territorial organization in favor of the Ministry for Territorial Administrations.

Structure 

The Ministry of the Interior is organised in the following bodies:

 The Secretariat of State for Security.
 The Directorate-General of the Police.
 The Directorate-General of the Civil Guard.
 The Directorate-General for International Relations and Immigration.
The Directorate-General for Coordination and Studies.
 The General Secretariat for Penitentiary Institutions.
 The Directorate-General for Criminal Enforcement and Social Reintegration.
The Undersecretariat of the Interior
 The Technical General Secretariat.
 The Directorate-General for Internal Policy.
 The Directorate-General for Traffic.
 The Directorate-General for Civil Protection and Emergencies.
 The Directorate-General for Support to Victims of Terrorism.

Agencies and companies 

 The Civil Guard.
 The National Police Corps.
 The Intelligence Center for Counter-Terrorism and Organized Crime.
 The State Security Infrastructure and Equipment Office.
 Penitentiary Work and Employment Training (public company).

List of Ministers of the Interior
The holders of the office of minister of the interior of Spain, from the reign of Ferdinand VII to the present time:

(1) Minister of Governance  (2) Minister of Public Order  (3) Minister of the Interior (4) Minister of the Interior and Governance (5) Minister of Justice and the Interior (6) Minister of Governance of the Peninsula (7) Between 1823 and 1835, neither a Ministry of the Interior nor Governance existed.

See also 
 Council of Ministers of Spain (9th Legislature)

Notes

References

External links 
 

1812 establishments in Spain
Spain, Interior
Interior
Interior
Spain
Government ministries of Spain